Osborne may refer to:

 Osborne (name)

Places

Australia
 Osborne, South Australia (disambiguation), places associated with the suburb in the Adelaide metropolitan area
 Osborne, New South Wales, a rural community in the Riverina region

Canada
 Osborne (Manitoba riding), a former provincial electoral district
 Osborne, Lambton County, Ontario
 Osborne, Manitoba, a hamlet
 Osborne, Nipissing District, a railway point, Ontario
 Osborne Township, Ontario
 Osborne Village, a neighbourhood in Winnipeg, Manitoba

United States
 Osborne, Kansas, a city
 Osborne, Pennsylvania, a borough, renamed Glen Osborne
 Osborne County, Kansas

Companies
 Osborne (computer retailer), an Australian computer retailer
 Osborne Computer Corporation, computer company created by Adam Osborne
  Osborne 1 portable computer
 Osborne Group, Spanish producer of spirits and meats

Other uses 
 The Osborne, a historic apartment building in Manhattan, New York, United States
 Osborne Association, a New York-based criminal justice reform and direct service organization
 Osborne bull, the unofficial national emblem of Spain
 Osborne effect, a marketing myth
 HMY Osborne (1870), a royal yacht of the United Kingdom
 USS Osborne (DD-295), a Clemson-class destroyer in the United States Navy

See also 
 Osborn (disambiguation)
 Osbourne (disambiguation)
 Osborne House (disambiguation)
 Osborne Park (disambiguation)
 Usborne (disambiguation)